This is a partial list of streets or roads in Metro Manila, Philippines, that underwent a name change in the past.

Background
Many place names in the country were changed after the islands achieved full sovereignty in 1946, following nearly four centuries of colonial occupation. Motorways named after Spanish and American colonists were subsequently altered to those of Filipino nationalist leaders and figures. This practice continued with the adoption of Tagalog (via its standardised register, Filipino) as the country's official national language.

Recently, streets have been renamed more aggressively after deceased or incumbent politicians, influential businessmen, and their relatives, which Filipino historian Gregorio F. Zaide described as a product of "bigoted nationalism" and "jingoism" done by self-serving public officials without regard to their historical significance.

City of Manila
This list is incomplete; you can help by expanding it by clicking the edit source button.

Quezon City
This list is incomplete; you can help by expanding it by clicking the edit source button.

Metro Manila
This list is incomplete; you can help by expanding it by clicking the edit source button.

See also
List of eponymous streets in Metro Manila
List of roads in Metro Manila
List of Metro Manila placename etymologies

References

External links
TravelerOnFoot.wordpress.com: "Old Street Names of Manila"

.
.
Streets, Renamed
Streets, Renamed
Metro Manila, Renamed
Manila, Renamed
Transportation in Metro Manila
Manila